Aymen Bouchhioua (born 24 August 1979) is a Tunisian former professional footballer who played as a forward.

Career
Bouchhioua was born in Tripoli, Libya.

He was signed by FC Aarau on 4 February 2008. and was formerly on trial with SC Paderborn 07 in summer 2007.

References

External links
 

1979 births
Living people
Association football forwards
Tunisian footballers
Tunisian expatriate footballers
Swiss Super League players
Ukrainian Premier League players
ES Zarzis players
Espérance Sportive de Tunis players
Étoile Sportive du Sahel players
FC Zorya Luhansk players
Expatriate footballers in Ukraine
Libyan footballers